Paywetseikkon railway station (lit. "Ant Hill") is a railway station on the Yangon Circular Railway in Yangon, Burma. It is located in North Okkalapa Township.

References

Railway stations in Yangon